Kang Hyeong-cheol is a South Korean film director and screenwriter. His first two films Scandal Makers (2008) and Sunny (2011) have been the highest grossing Korean films of their respective years, and are both among the highest grossing Korean films of all time. Kang won Best Director at the 48th Grand Bell Awards in 2011.

Filmography

Awards and nominations

References

External links

Living people
South Korean film directors
South Korean screenwriters
Place of birth missing (living people)
Year of birth missing (living people)
Best Director Paeksang Arts Award (film) winners